Groupe Dynamite is a Canada-based clothing company, originally founded in 1975 as The Garage Clothing Company. The company creates, designs, markets and distributes from its head office in Montreal, Quebec, and operates over 300 stores across Canada and the United States, with more than 3,800 employees (as of 2020).

In September 2020, the group filed for creditor protection under the Companies' Creditors Arrangement Act.

In December 2020, the group partnered with Uber to offer same-day delivery to customers in the Montreal area. Groupe Dynamite became the first national retailer in Canada to offer this service.

History

Garage 

Created in 1975, The Garage Clothing Company was the inception of the current company.

Groupe Dynamite 
Groupe Dynamite was established in 1984. In 2020, Groupe announced they would be restructuring the company, following their filing for creditor protection under the Companies' Creditors Arrangement Act. They also announced following the approval of that protection by the Superior Court of Quebec, they would seek provisional recognition under Chapter 15 of the US Bankruptcy Code .

External links

References

Clothing retailers of Canada
Companies based in Montreal
Mount Royal, Quebec